Robert Joseph Motl (July 26, 1920 – June 3, 2007) was an American football end in the All-America Football Conference for the Chicago Rockets.  He played college football at Northwestern University and was drafted in the ninth round of the 1943 NFL Draft by the Washington Redskins.

1920 births
2007 deaths
American football wide receivers
Chicago Rockets players
Players of American football from Chicago
Northwestern Wildcats football players